Garden City station is a train station in Garden City, Kansas, United States. It is served by Amtrak's Southwest Chief line. It is located in downtown Garden City along the BNSF Railway La Junta Subdivision. Garden City station was originally built in 1907 by the Atchison, Topeka and Santa Fe Railway and upon the restoration of 2002, was declared a historic landmark by the Finney County Preservation Alliance.  From 2015 to 2019 the station has consistently been the fourth-most-frequented Amtrak station in Kansas.

See also 
List of Amtrak stations

References

External links

Garden City Amtrak Station (USA Rail Guide -- Train Web)
ATSF Garden City, Kansas Depot (Surviving Santa Fe Depots)

Amtrak stations in Kansas
Atchison, Topeka and Santa Fe Railway stations
Buildings and structures in Finney County, Kansas
Railway stations in the United States opened in 1907